Dairon Mosquera Chaverra (born 23 July 1992) is a Colombian professional footballer who plays as a defender for Categoría Primera A club Independiente Santa Fe.

Honours

Club 
Santa Fe
 Copa Sudamericana    : 2015
 Categoría Primera A  : 2014-II
 Superliga Colombiana : 2015

External links 
 
 Dairon Mosquera at DIMAYOR
 Dairon Mosquera at Football-Lineups.com

1992 births
Living people
Colombian footballers
Sportspeople from Chocó Department
Colombian expatriate footballers
Categoría Primera A players
Categoría Primera B players
Atlético Bucaramanga footballers
Cortuluá footballers
Independiente Medellín footballers
C.F. Pachuca players
Club Olimpia footballers
Independiente Santa Fe footballers
Association football fullbacks
Colombian expatriate sportspeople in Mexico
Colombian expatriate sportspeople in Paraguay
Expatriate footballers in Mexico
Expatriate footballers in Paraguay